The 1902 Philadelphia Phillies football season  was their second season in existence. This season the team, was sponsored by the Philadelphia Phillies Baseball Club and played in the first National Football League. The team finished with an overall record of 8-3, including a 2-3 record in league play to finish third in the standings.

Schedule

Games between NFL teams are represented in bold.

Game notes

References

Phillies vs. Athletics National Football League, 1902

Philadelphia Phillies (NFL)